Çatak is a village in the District of Nazilli, Aydın Province, Turkey. As of 2010, it had a population of 174 people. A mountainous village, it lies near the border with Izmir Province.

References

Villages in Nazilli District